The LSWR T6 class was a class of express passenger 4-4-0 steam locomotives designed for the London and South Western Railway by William Adams. Ten were constructed at Nine Elms Locomotive Works between 1885 and 1886.

The class were numbered 677–686, and were a development of the X2 class, based on experience gained with the locomotives in traffic. The boiler was based on that used in the T3 class, and shared the main dimensions.

All passed to the Southern Railway at the grouping in 1923. Withdrawals started in 1933, and by the end of 1937 only two remained. No. 684 went in 1940, and the last, 681 was retired in April 1943. All were scrapped.

References 

T06
4-4-0 locomotives
Railway locomotives introduced in 1895
Scrapped locomotives
Standard gauge steam locomotives of Great Britain